Sternacutus striatus is a species of beetle in the family Cerambycidae. It was described by Gilmour in 1962.

References

Beetles described in 1962